Aulacophora antennata is a species of leaf beetle in the genus Aulacophora.

References

Aulacophora
Beetles described in 1886
Taxa named by Joseph Sugar Baly